Shelter is an album by trombonist Craig Harris and Tailgaters Tales which was recorded in 1986 and released on the JMT label.

Reception
The AllMusic review by Brian Olewnick called it "An uneven set, but the highlights and generally fine level of playing make Shelter worth a listen, depending on one's tolerance for mawkishness".

Track listing
All compositions by Craig Harris
 "Africans Unite" - 4:42   
 "Shelter Suite:" - 17:26 
 "Shelter"
 "Subway Scenarios"
 "Sea of Swollen Hands"  
 "Three Hots and a Cot"  
 "Shelter (Reprise)" 
 "Bags and Rags"
 "Cootie" - 7:12   
 "Reminiscing" - 4:56   
 "Sound Sketches" - 9:00

Personnel
Craig Harris - trombone, didgeridoo
Don Byron - clarinet, bass clarinet
Eddie Allen - trumpet
Anthony Cox - bass
Pheeroan Aklaff - drums
Rod Williams - piano (track 1)
Tunde Samuel - vocals (tracks 1 & 2)

References 

1987 albums
Craig Harris albums
JMT Records albums
Winter & Winter Records albums